Steveroy Anthony (born 7 July 1971) is an Antigua and Barbudan football player. He has played for Antigua and Barbuda national team.

National team statistics

References

1971 births
Living people
Antigua and Barbuda footballers
Place of birth missing (living people)
Antigua and Barbuda international footballers
Association football defenders